The 1981 New Zealand bravery awards were announced via a Special Honours List on 17 December 1981, and recognised seven people for acts of bravery in 1980 or 1981.

Queen's Commendation for Brave Conduct
 Roger Keith Millard – constable, New Zealand Police, Haast.
 Kevin Murray Hallett – of Alexandra.

 Frederick Fowler – of Nelson.

 Anthony Claude Wilson – police liaison officer, Customs Department, Wellington.

 Kevin John Truman – constable, New Zealand Police, Taihape.
 Paul Fannin – formerly of Wanganui Aero Work, Taihape, now of Queensland, Australia.

Queen's Commendation for Valuable Service in the Air
 Douglas Mackenzie Maxwell – of Alexandra.

References

Bravery
Bravery awards
New Zealand bravery awards